Wagner is derived from the Germanic surname , meaning  or . The Wagner surname is German. The name is also well established in Scandinavia, the Netherlands, eastern Europe, and elsewhere as well as in all German-speaking countries, and among Ashkenazi Jews.

The Wagner surname was first found in Saxony, where the family became a prominent contributor to the development of the area from ancient times. The alternatively spelled surname Wegner has its origin in Silesia.

This common occupational surname was often given to one who transported produce or other goods via high-sided wagons or carts. Among some German populations, especially the Pennsylvania Germans, Wagner also denoted a wagon-maker, wainwright, or cartwright.

People with the surname Wagner
 Adolph Wagner, (1835–1917), German economist
 Agnieszka Wagner (born 1970), Polish actress
 Allan Wagner (born 1942), Peruvian diplomat
 Allan R. Wagner (1934–2018), American experimental psychologist and learning theorist
 Alex Wagner (born 1977), American television host, liberal journalist and author
 Andreas Wagner (born 1967), Austrian-American evolutionary biologist
 Andreas Wagner (born 1972), German politician
 Ann Wagner (born 1962), American politician, U.S. Representative from Missouri
 Annett Wagner-Michel (born 1955), German chess master
 Antonio Wagner de Moraes (born 1966), Brazilian football forward
 Arthur Wagner (1824–1902), English clergyman from Brighton
 Ashley Wagner (born 1991), American figure skater
 Audrey Wagner (1927–1984), American baseball player (1943–1949), obstetrician and gynecologist
 Austin Wagner (born 1997), Canadian professional ice hockey player playing for United States teams
 Ben Wagner (born 1980), American radio sportscaster
 Billy Wagner (born 1971), American Major League Baseball player
 Bobby Wagner (born 1990), American NFL football player
 Carl-Ludwig Wagner (1930–2012), German politician
 Charles Wagner (1852–1919), French pastor and author who was invited to preach at the White House
 Chris Wagner (born 1991), American National Hockey League player
 Cosima Wagner (1837–1930), diarist and director of the Bayreuth Festival, daughter of Franz Liszt and widow of Richard Wagner
 Daniel Wagner, Drummer for Greta Van Fleet
 Daniela Wagner (born 1957), German politician
 Dan Wagner, Street Photographer, Author of Schmendrick a novel and Never Seeing Nothing - Street Photography Book 
 Dan Wagner (born 1963), British entrepreneur
 Dan Wagner (data scientist)
 Danny Wagner, American basketball player
 David Wagner, lead singer of the rock band Crow
 David Wagner, several people
 David A. Wagner (born 1974), American computer security and cryptography researcher
 David L. Wagner (born 1956), American entomologist
 Dennis Wagner (born 1958), American football coach
 Dennis Wagner (born 1997), German chess grandmaster
 Dinara Wagner (born 1999), German chess woman grandmaster
 Eduard Wagner (1894–1944), quartermaster-general of the German Army in World War II
 Eric Wagner (1959–2021), American heavy metal vocalist
 Florence Signaigo Wagner (1919–2019), American botanist who served as president of the American Fern Society
 Franz Wagner (basketball) (born 2001), German basketball player
 Franz Josef Wagner (born 1943), German journalist
 Friedelind Wagner (1918–1991), German writer and broadcaster, daughter of Siegfried and Winifred Wagner
 Fridolin Wagner (born 1997), German footballer
 Gary Wagner (born 1940), American baseball player
 George D. Wagner (1829–1869), American politician, farmer and Union general during the American Civil War
 Gerhard Maria Wagner (born 1954), Austrian Roman Catholic priest who was nominated auxiliary bishop in Linz, but didn't accept
 Gerhard Wagner (Nazi physician), (1888–1939), the first Reich Doctors' Leader (Reichsärzteführer) of Nazi Germany
 Gottfried Wagner (born 1947) writer and critic of the Wagner family, son of Wolfgang Wagner
 Gudrun Wagner (1944–2007), second wife of Wolfgang Wagner
 Günter P. Wagner (born 1954), Austrian biologist
 Guillermo Wagner Granizo (1923–1995) American ceramic tile muralist in Northern California. 
 Gustav Wagner (1911–1980), Austrian Nazi SS officer at Sobibór extermination camp
 Gustav Wagner (disambiguation)
 Harvey M. Wagner (1931–2017), American management scientist and professor
 Haylie Wagner (born 1993), American softball player in the National Pro Fastpitch league
 Heinrich Leopold Wagner (National Pro Fastpitch), German dramatist and author
 Henry Michell Wagner (1792–1870), Vicar of Brighton 1824–1870
 Honus Wagner (1874–1955), American baseball player
 Ina Wagner (born 1946), Austrian scientist and university professor
 James Elvin Wagner (1873–1969), American clergyman
 James Wagner (poet) (born 1969), American poet
 James W. Wagner (born 1953), president of Emory University, Atlanta, Georgia
 Jane Wagner (born 1935), American writer, director and producer
 Jaques Wagner (born 1951), Brazilian federal government's Minister of Defence
 Jasmin Wagner (born 1980), stage name Blümchen, German singer, actress, model and spokeswoman
 Jenny Wagner (born 1984), German physicist and cosmologist
 Jens-Christian Wagner (born 1966), German historian
 Jill Wagner (born 1979), American actress
 Johann Wagner (born 1990), Australian rules footballer
 Johann Peter Alexander Wagner (1730–1809), German rococo sculptor
 Johann Andreas Wagner (1797–1861), German zoologist
 Johann Philipp Wagner (1799-1879), German merchant and inventor
 John Wagner (born 1949), American-born British comics writer
 Josef Wagner, several people
 Kai Wagner (born 1997), German footballer
 Karl Willy Wagner (1883–1953), German pioneer in the theory of electronic filters
 Karl Edward Wagner (1945–1994), American horror, science fiction and fantasy writer
 Katharina Wagner (born 1949), German opera director, daughter of Wolfgang and Gudrun Wagner
 Klaus Wagner, (1910–2000) German mathematician
 Kurt Wagner (1904-1989), German general
 Lindsay Wagner (born 1949), American actress
 Martin Wagner, several people
 Mary Wagner (born 1949), American politician and jurist
 Matt Wagner (born 1961), American comics writer and artist
 Melinda Wagner (born 1957), American composer
 Mike Wagner (born 1949), American retired football player, retired football coach, and bank officer
 Mirel Wagner (born 1987) Ethiopia-born Finnish singer-songwriter
 Moritz Wagner (1813–1887), German German explorer, collector, geographer and evolutionary biologist
 Moritz Wagner (basketball) (born 1997), German basketball player
 Nándor Wagner (1922–1997), Hungarian sculptor
 Neil Wagner (born 1986), South African-born New Zealand cricketer
 Neil Wagner (baseball) (born 1984), American Nippon Professional Baseball and Major League Baseball player
 Nike Wagner (born 1945), German dramaturge, daughter of Wieland Wagner
 Nikolai Wagner (1829–1907), Russian zoologist, writer and psychic researcher
 Otto Wagner (1841–1918), Austrian architect and urban planner
 Paul Wagner (born 1967), American baseball player
 Paula Wagner (born 1946), American film and theatre producer and film executive
 Renan Wagner (born 1991), Brazilian footballer
 Richard Wagner (1813–1883), German composer
 Richard Wagner (judge) (born 1957), Canadian judge and 18th Chief Justice of Canada (2017–present)
 Richard Wagner (novelist) (born 1952), Romanian-German novelist
 Richard E. Wagner (born 1941), American economist
 Richard K. Wagner, American psychologist and professor
 Richard Paul Wagner (1882–1953), Chief of Design for Deutsche Reichsbahn 1922–1942; responsible for standard locomotive designs
 Robert Wagner (born 1930), American actor
 Robert Wagner (disambiguation), several people
 Robert Ferdinand Wagner (1877–1953), American politician, U.S. Senator from New York
 Robert Ferdinand Wagner Jr. (1910–1991), American politician and mayor of New York City
 Robert Heinrich Wagner (1895–1946), German Nazi Gauleiter and Reich Governor of Alsace, executed for war crimes
 Robin Wagner (figure skater), American retired skater and skating coach
 Robin Wagner (designer) (born 1933), Broadway set designer
 Ruth Wagner (born 1940), German politician
 Ryan Wagner (born 1982), Major League Baseball player
 Sandro Wagner (born 1987), German footballer
 Siegfried Wagner (1869–1930), German composer and conductor, son of Richard and Cosima Wagner
 Stanley Wagner, several people
 Steve Wagner (disambiguation)
 Sue Wagner (born 1940), American politician
 Thomas Wagner (disambiguation)
 Tini Wagner (born 1919), Dutch swimmer
 Tyler Wagner (born 1991), American Major League Baseball and Atlantic League of Professional Baseball player
 Viktor Wagner (1908–1981), Russian mathematician
 Vladimir Wagner (1849 –1934), Russian psychologist and naturalist
 Walter Wagner (footballer) (born 1949), German footballer
 Walter Wagner (notary) (1907–1945), German notary who married Adolf Hitler and Eva Braun
 Warren H. Wagner (1920–2000), American botanist
 Warren Lambert Wagner (born 1950), American botanist and botanical curator for the National Museum of Natural History 
 Webster Wagner (1817–1882), American railroad inventor, manufacturer and politician 
 Wieland Wagner (1917–1966), German opera director and producer, son of Siegfried Wagner and Winifred Wagner
 Wilhelm Richard Wagner, full name of German composer Richard Wagner
 Wilhelm Wagner (scholar) (1843–1880), a German scholar of Greek poetry
 Wilhelm Wagner (entomologist) (1895–1977), German entomologist
 Willi Wagner (born 1941), German Olympic athlete
 Winifred Wagner (1897–1980), British-born director of the Bayreuth Festival, wife of Siegfried Wagner and friend of Adolf Hitler
 Wolfgang Wagner (1919–2010), German opera festival director, younger brother of Wieland Wagner
 Wolfgang Wagner (social psychologist), Austrian social psychologist

See also
 Wagner family tree, the composer Richard Wagner and his family, many of whom have been active in the arts
 Julius Wagner-Jauregg (1857–1940), Austrian physician, Nobel Prize laureate in medicine
 Vagner (name)
 Waggoner (disambiguation), includes list of people with surname Waggoner

References

German-language surnames
Jewish surnames
Occupational surnames

ru:Вагнер
sl:Wagner